Pevely is a city in Jefferson County, Missouri, United States, and is also a suburb of St. Louis. The population was 6,107, at the 2020 United States Census.

History
Pevely was platted in 1860. A post office called Pevely has been in operation since 1858.

The Gustave Greystone-Meissner House was listed on the National Register of Historic Places in 1974.

Geography

Pevely is located at  (38.283894, -90.397022).

Demographics

2010 census
As of the census of 2010, there were 5,484 people, 2,128 households, and 1,493 families living in the city. The racial makeup of the city was 96.2% White, 1.0% African American, 0.3% Native American, 0.3% Asian, 0.1% from other races, and 2.0% from two or more races. Hispanic or Latino of any race were 1.2% of the population.

There were 2,128 households, of which 41.2% had children under the age of 18 living with them, 46.2% were married couples living together, 17.2% had a female householder with no husband present, 6.8% had a male householder with no wife present, and 29.8% were non-families. 23.6% of all households were made up of individuals, and 6.3% had someone living alone who was 65 years of age or older. The average household size was 2.57 and the average family size was 3.00.

The median age in the city was 31.5 years. 28.6% of residents were under the age of 18; 10% were between the ages of 18 and 24; 28.8% were from 25 to 44; 23.8% were from 45 to 64; and 8.8% were 65 years of age or older. The gender makeup of the city was 48.2% male and 51.8% female.

2000 census
As of the census of 2000, there were 3,768 people, 1,411 households, and 1,008 families living in the city. As of 2006, the city boasts almost 4,400 in population. The racial makeup of the city was 95.89% White, 1.59% African American, 0.37% Native American, 0.45% Asian, 0.29% from other races, and 1.41% from two or more races. Hispanic or Latino of any race were 0.93% of the population.

There were 1,411 households, out of which 40.5% had children under the age of 18 living with them, 48.1% were married couples living together, 16.7% had a female householder with no husband present, and 28.5% were non-families. 23.4% of all households were made up of individuals, and 8.6% had someone living alone who was 65 years of age or older. The average household size was 2.67 and the average family size was 3.12.

In the city the population was spread out, with 30.1% under the age of 18, 10.5% from 18 to 24, 30.4% from 25 to 44, 20.3% from 45 to 64, and 8.6% who were 65 years of age or older. The median age was 31 years. For every 100 females, there were 93.3 males. For every 100 females age 18 and over, there were 90.7 males.

The median income for a household in the city was $34,916, and the median income for a family was $37,288. The per capita income for the city was $14,403. About 19.7% of families and 19.6% of the population were below the poverty line, including 25.7% of those under age 18 and 19.5% of those age 65 or over.

Education
Dunklin R-V School District serves Pevely.

Attractions
I-55 Raceway is a high-banked 1/3 mile high banked dirt oval that features racing on Saturday nights. Ken Schrader is co-owner/promoter of I-55 Raceway with Ray Marler.

References

External links
 City website
 I-55- I-55 Raceway
 Pevely Press Pevely Press

Cities in Jefferson County, Missouri
Cities in Missouri